We Them Niggas is the third album released by Roc Raida.  It was released on August 6, 2001 for Fat Beats and featured production by Roc Raida.  For this album, Raida handled the production while Wayne-O handled the raps.

Track listing
"We Them Niggas"- 2:35  
"What You Gonna Do"- 3:12  
"Burn That Ass"- 2:51  
"Skit"- 3:07  
"You Don't Stop"- 2:22  
"Ill Kick Your Ass"- 1:51  
"Judge Craig"- 2:11  
"Stepp Up Front"- 2:17  
"I'm Bringin It"- 3:07  
"Kick Flows"- 4:22  
"What Gong Show"- 3:10

2001 albums
Roc Raida albums